The Cuarto River ('Fourth River'), also known as Saladillo is a river of Argentina which crosses the southern part of the Province of Córdoba, and merges with the Tercero River to form the Carcarañá River (a tributary of the Paraná River via the Coronda River). The Cuarto River is also known as Cochancharava, the name given to it by the Ranquel Indians.

The name Saladillo is generally used for the lower course, below the Bañado del Río Saladillo wetland.

See also
 List of rivers of Argentina
 Río Cuarto, Córdoba

References

Rivers of Argentina
Rivers of Córdoba Province, Argentina
Tributaries of the Paraná River